Robert J. Tierney is a professor of linguistics and literature and currently a professor at University of British Columbia, having previously held an Honorary Professorship at University of Sydney, and is also a published author of articles and books, largely collected by libraries worldwide.

References

External links
JSTOR

Academic staff of the University of Sydney
Linguists from the United States
American non-fiction writers
Jacksonville State University alumni
University of Georgia alumni
Living people
Year of birth missing (living people)
Place of birth missing (living people)